is a Japanese football player currently playing for Fagiano Okayama.

Club statistics
Updated to end of 2018 season.

References

External links
Profile at Jubilo Iwata

 Player profile at Goal.com

1986 births
Living people
Association football people from Tokyo
Japanese footballers
J1 League players
J2 League players
Júbilo Iwata players
Omiya Ardija players
Fagiano Okayama players
Association football midfielders
People from Ōme, Tokyo